Ismaila Shareef is a large farming village of (Tehsil Kharian) Gujrat District, Punjab, Pakistan.

Ismaila Shareef is located on Kharian Road, between the two cities of Kharian and Dinga, between 'Head-Rasool Nehar' (A river flowing directly from Kashmir) and 'Saifal' (a small canal running from Head Rasool Nehar), Ismaila Shareef falls under the Tehsil of Kharian and within the district of Gujrat, Pakistan.

Ismaila Shareef is known within the Gujrat district for shrines of Sufi saints and their Dargahs. Most people of Ismaila Shareef belong to the Gujjar tribe.

Populated places in Gujrat District